Kosovo is a village in Batetsky District of Novgorod Oblast, Russia.

Rural localities in Novgorod Oblast